Tiāntóng Rújìng (天童如淨; Japanese: Tendō Nyojō) (1163-1228) was a Caodong Buddhist monk living in Qìngdé Temple (慶徳寺; Japanese: Keitoku-ji) on Tiāntóng Mountain (天童山; Japanese: Tendouzan) in Yinzhou District, Ningbo. He taught and gave dharma transmission to Sōtō Zen founder Dōgen as well as early Sōtō monk Jakuen (寂円 Jìyuán).

His teacher was Xuedou Zhijian (雪竇智鑑, 1105–1192), who was the sixteenth-generation dharma descendant of Huineng.

According to Keizan, when Ruijing became a leader, he didn't put himself above the other monks. He wore the black surplice and robe of a monk. He was given a purple vestment of honor by the emperor of China, but he declined it. Even after reaching enlightenment, he was willing to clean the bathroom. 

He is traditionally the originator of the terms shikantaza and shinjin-datsuraku ("casting off of body and mind").

References

External links
  略述天童如净禅师的生平与禅学思想 a summary of some sources about Rujing

Chan patriarchs
1163 births
1228 deaths